The dwarf gulper shark (Centrophorus atromarginatus) is a dogfish of the family Centrophoridae found in the Indo-West Pacific oceans, from the Gulf of Aden, Japan, Taiwan, and northern Papua New Guinea.
As a Squaliform, Centrophorus atromarginatus has high amounts of Squalene in its liver, and it is fished for this resource. It is a deep-water fish, whose habitat is in bathydemersal waters.

References

 1.
 2.FAO
 3.

dwarf gulper shark
dwarf gulper shark
Fish of Japan
Fish of Taiwan
Fish of New Guinea
Palk Strait